Adamsville is a Canadian unincorporated community, located in Kent County, New Brunswick. The community is situated in southeastern New Brunswick, to the northwest of Moncton. Adamsville is located mainly on the New Brunswick Route 126.

Places of note
Adamsville Lake has been an important trading spot to its original aboriginal Miq-Maq (Mic-Mac) people.

History

Notable people

See also
List of communities in New Brunswick

References

Bordering communities
Coal Branch, New Brunswick
Grangeville, New Brunswick
Saint-Augustin, New Brunswick
Saint-Sosime, New Brunswick

Communities in Kent County, New Brunswick